The Best of & Rest of Sham 69 Live is live and compilation album by punk rock band Sham 69. It was released as a compilation album in 1989 and live album in 1994 (see 1989 in music).

Track listing 
"Intro" - 1:15
"What Have We Got" - 1:26
"Red London" - 2:35
"Voices" - 2:49
"Angels with Dirty Faces" - 3:08
"Questions and Answers" - 3:21
"That's Life" - 3:35
"Borstal Breakout" - 2:35
"Everybody's Innocent" - 2:28
"Joey's on the Street" - 3:10
"They Don't Understand" - 2:15
"Tell Us The Truth" - 2:36
"Hersham Boys" - 5:08
"James Dean" - 2:43
"White Riot" - 2:05 (The Clash cover)
"If the Kids Are United" - 3:16

References 

Sham 69 live albums
Sham 69 compilation albums
1989 live albums
1994 live albums